Yeşilli District is a district of the Mardin Province of Turkey. The seat of the district is the town of Yeşilli and the population was 14,095 in 2021.

Status 
With the administrative reform in 2012, Yeşilli District contains fourteen neighborhoods of which five form the town of Yeşilli.

Settlements

Center neighborhoods 

 Bahçebaşı
 Gül
 Karşıyaka
 Şirinevler
 Tepebaşı

Rural neighborhoods 

 Alıçlı
 Bülbül
 Dereyanı
 Koyunlu
 Kütüklü
 Ovaköy
 Sancar
 Uzunköy
 Zeytinli

References 

Districts of Mardin Province